Original Meanings: Politics and Ideas in the Making of the Constitution is a non-fiction book authored by Jack N. Rakove and published on March 25, 1996 in hardcover by Knopf and on May 26, 1997 by Vintage Books in paperback.  Rakove investigates the meaning of the United States Constitution in modern-day society and political topics. It won the 1997 Pulitzer Prize for History.

References

External links
Booknotes interview with Rakove on Original Meanings, July 6, 1997

1996 non-fiction books
20th-century history books
Pulitzer Prize for History-winning works
History books about the United States
United States constitutional commentary
Alfred A. Knopf books